Luděk Frýbort (25 August 1933 –  20 November 2019) was a writer and author living in Hanover, Germany.

He published a large number of articles and multiple books with political commentaries, in both Czech and German languages. His texts, written in a distinctive archaic style, often defend conservative wrorldview by common-sense arguments and use hyperbole to question various currently fashionable opinions. He often wrote about history and important, though often largely forgotten historical persons such as Joseph Radetzky von Radetz, he also publicly advocated monarchism.

Books 
 Češi očima exulanta,  vydavatelství Annonce 2000 - výběr z úvah a esejů 
 Praotcové, Annonce 2001 - polohistorický román
 Svět bez růžových brýlí,  Annonce 2002  - pozorování a úvahy z cest 
 Je na Západ cesta dlouhá…, Annonce 2003  - výběr z úvah a esejů 
 Prokletí rodu Slavníkova, Annonce 2004  - historický román 
 Mlýny boží i ďáblovy, Annonce 2006 - román z nedávné minulosti 
 Z blízka i z daleka bez růžových brýlí, Annonce 2009 - pozorování a úvahy z cest 
 Vlast naše Západ, Euroslavica 2011 - výběr z úvah a esejů

References

1933 births
2019 deaths
Czech novelists
Czech monarchists
Czech male writers
Czech expatriates in Germany
German male novelists
People from Jičín